Khua or KHUA may refer to:

 Khua, a variety of the Mon–Khmer Bru language of Southeast Asia
 Khoa, a dairy product of South Asia
 KHUA, the ICAO code for Redstone Army Airfield, a military airport in Alabama, US

See also 
 Kuha (disambiguation)